SVX or svx may refer to:

Vehicles
 Subaru Alcyone SVX, two-door grand tourer coupé automobile
 Defender SVX, model of special edition Land Rover Defender

Other uses
 Koltsovo Airport (IATA code), airport in Yekaterinburg, Russia
 SVX (potexvirus), potexvirus affecting Chinese scallion
 Skalvian language (ISO 639-3 code), a Baltic language

See also
 8SVX, audio file format standard developed by Electronic Arts for the Commodore-Amiga computer series